The Debla is a small river in the Pădurea Craiului Mountains of Bihor County, Romania. It disappears into the Gălășeni Cave near the village Gălășeni and continues its flow underground through the cave. It emerges in the Groapa Moțului Cave, near the village of Josani. It flows into the lower reach of the river Dobrinești.

References

 Doua vai din Muntii Padurea Craiului:Mniera si Poiana 

Rivers of Romania
Rivers of Bihor County